The Varberg Vipers, also known as Varberg Hockey or Varberg HK, is a Swedish ice hockey club located in Varberg. The club will play the 2014–15 season in group South of Hockeyettan, the third tier of Swedish ice hockey. The club plays its home games in Varbergs Ishall, which has a capacity of 544 spectators.

References

External links
Official website
Club profile on Eliteprospects.com

Ice hockey teams in Halland County
Ice hockey teams in Sweden
1981 establishments in Sweden
Ice hockey clubs established in 1981
2011 establishments in Sweden
Ice hockey clubs established in 2011